Lleyton Hewitt was the defending champion but lost in the quarterfinals to Sébastien Grosjean.

Andy Roddick won in the final 6–3, 6–3 against Grosjean.

Seeds
The top eight seeds received a bye to the second round.

  Lleyton Hewitt (quarterfinals)
  Andre Agassi (semifinals)
  Andy Roddick (champion)
  Paradorn Srichaphan (second round)
  Sjeng Schalken (third round)
  Sébastien Grosjean (final)
  Tim Henman (semifinals)
  Xavier Malisse (quarterfinals)
  Jarkko Nieminen (second round)
  Jan-Michael Gambill (second round)
  Taylor Dent (quarterfinals)
  Max Mirnyi (second round)
  Mardy Fish (first round)
  Mark Philippoussis (first round)
  Robby Ginepri (first round)
  Wayne Arthurs (first round)

Draw

Finals

Top half

Section 1

Section 2

Bottom half

Section 3

Section 4

External links
 2003 Stella Artois Championships draw

2003 Stella Artois Championships